The Cold Springs Ranch House near Forsyth, Montana is a log house built in 1908.  It was listed on the National Register of Historic Places in 1990.

The ranch house is a -story building built of peeled, hewn cottonwood logs.

It was deemed "significant as the principal residence and headquarters site of Rosebud County's largest late 19th/early 20th century cattle and sheep ranching operation. The home is architecturally significant, as well; it was one of the largest most elegant ranch homes in early 20th century eastern Montana. Its highly rustic cottonwood-log exterior "fits" its environment quite well and shows evidence of extremely careful craftsmanship. Most of the home's original exterior character remains in evidence today, preserving its status as one of Montana's finest large ranch homes."

The ranch was founded in 1877, soon after Custer's defeat at the Battle of Little Bighorn, as part of settlement supported by increased military presence in the area.

References

Ranches on the National Register of Historic Places in Montana
National Register of Historic Places in Rosebud County, Montana
Houses completed in 1908
1908 establishments in Montana
Log buildings and structures on the National Register of Historic Places in Montana
Log houses in the United States
Houses in Rosebud County, Montana
Houses on the National Register of Historic Places in Montana